}}

 is a Japanese medical manga series created by Akira Nagai and illustrated by Tarō Nogizaka; following Nagai's death in 2004, Nogizaka became the sole author, with medical supervision taken by Mie Yoshinuma. The manga was serialized in Shogakukan's seinen manga magazine Big Comic Superior from April 2002 to January 2011, with its chapters collected in 25 tankōbon volumes.

It was adapted into a live action series, which was broadcast for three seasons between April 2006 and December 2010.

In 2005, the manga won the 50th Shogakukan Manga Award in the general category.

Plot
Ryūtarou Asada is a prodigal surgeon who was exiled from the medical field. He is recruited by Akira Katō, an assistant professor, who wishes to use his skills to complete her thesis on the Batista procedure to promote herself politically in order to change the corruption in the Japanese medical system. Ryūtarou accepts and begins by recruiting a team skilled enough for the surgery.

Characters

Ryūtarou is a prodigal surgeon who was framed for medical malpractice and exiled from the medical field. He is recruited by Akira Katō to work in a medical university. He was portrayed in the live action series by Kenji Sakaguchi.

Miki is a surgical nurse and Ryūtarou's lover. She is portrayed in the live action series by Asami Mizukawa.

Akira is an assistant professor who aims to become a professor to change the corrupt Japanese medical system. She is portrayed in the live action series by Izumi Inamori.

Noboru is a hard working medical intern who is not assimilated into the corrupt Japanese medical system. He is portrayed in the live action series by Teppei Koike.

Keisuke is a cardiologist whose priority is for the patient and not the hospital. He is portrayed by Kuranosuke Sasaki.

Monji is a skilled anesthesiologist who charges high amount for every surgery. He is portrayed in the live action series by Sadao Abe.

Takeo is the professor of the cardiology department. He values his reputation over the lives of his patients. He is portrayed in the live action series by Ittoku Kishibe.

Gunji is Miki's half brother and is a strong political figure in the medical field. He was the one who framed Asada for medical malpractice and used his influence to exile him from the medical field. He is portrayed in the live action series by Kazuki Kitamura.

Naoto Kitō is the professor of the emergency department who wants to recruit Ryūtarou into his department.

Shōko Kitō is the professor of the emergency department. She is later the dean of the hospital. She is portrayed in the live action series by Mari Natsuki.

Takehiko Kihara is Kato's assistant. He is portrayed in the live action series by Tetsuhiro Ikeda.

Media

Manga
The series debuted in Shogakukan's seinen manga magazine Big Comic Superior on April 26, 2002. Nagai died of liver cancer in 2004, and Nogizaka became the sole author of the series, with medical supervision taken by Mie Yoshinuma. The series finished on January 28, 2011. Shogakukan collected its chapters into twenty-five tankōbon volumes, released between September 30, 2002, and February 26, 2011.

Volume list

Live action series
The manga was adapted into a series of live action dramas by Fuji TV. Directed by both Satoshi Kubota and Naruhide Mizuta, the first season of the live action series was produced by Sōsuke Osabe and Yasuyuki Asuyuki with Koji Hayashi as the scriptwriter. The series ran for 11 episodes which were broadcast on Fuji TV between April 13, 2006 and June 29, 2006. The ending theme for the first season is "Believe" by Ai. Fuji TV released a DVD box set on October 27, 2006. The soundtrack for the series was released by Universal Sigma on June 7, 2006, which was re-released by Universal Sigma on September 18, 2013.

Directed by Hiroki Hayama, Kazunari Hoshino and Naruhide Mizuta, the second season of the live action series was produced by Sōsuke Osabe and Reiko Misao with Koji Hayashi as the scriptwriter. The series ran for 11 episodes which were broadcast on Fuji TV between October 11, 2007 and December 20, 2007. The ending theme for the second season is "One" by Ai. Fuji TV released a DVD box set on April 16, 2008. The soundtrack for the series was released by Universal Sigma on November 28, 2007, which was re-released by Universal Sigma on September 18, 2013.

Directed by Hiroki Hayama, Ryo Tanaka and Naruhide Mizuta, the third season of the live action series was produced by Tsuneya Watanabe with Koji Hayashi as the scriptwriter. The series ran for 10 episodes which were broadcast on Fuji TV between October 14, 2010 and December 16, 2010. Fuji TV released a DVD box set on April 6, 2011. The soundtrack for the series was released by Universal Sigma on December 8, 2010.

A fourth season of the drama has been announced. The fourth season of the drama aired January 9, 2014 to March 20, 2014.

Reception
Iryū: Team Medical Dragon received the 50th Shogakukan Manga Award for general manga in 2005.

Notes

References

External links
 Manga Sanctuary review 
 25 Manga News review 
 PlaneteBD 1 review 
 PlaneteBD 2 review 
 PlaneteBD 5 review 
 PlaneteBD 7 review 
 PlaneteBD 8 review 
 

2002 manga
Japanese medical television series
Live-action shows scored by Hiroyuki Sawano
Medical anime and manga
Seinen manga
Shogakukan manga
Winners of the Shogakukan Manga Award for general manga